Jimmy Saied Wehba (September 29, 1934 – August 19, 2010) was an American professional wrestler and manager better known by his ring name Skandor Akbar, which translates as "Alexander the Great". Akbar led the villainous stable Devastation, Inc. in Bill Watts's Universal Wrestling Federation during the promotion's heyday in the 1980s, as well as other regional territories, including World Class Championship Wrestling and the Global Wrestling Federation.

Early life
Wehba was born on September 29, 1934, in Wichita Falls, Texas, and grew up in Vernon, Texas. His father was from Lebanon, and his mother, Mary, had Arab roots, though she too was born in Texas. With two older sisters, Jimmy was the baby of the family. As a preteen, he started weightlifting (at one point he reportedly bench pressed 500 pounds) as his cousin had a gym. He also worked as a bouncer.

Professional wrestling career

Singles wrestler
Akbar started out as a professional wrestler in 1963 as Jimmy Wehba. He changed his name to Skandor Akbar at the suggestion of Fritz Von Erich in 1966 in order to sound more Arabic. Akbar teamed with Danny Hodge and eventually turned on him, starting a feud. Akbar joined the World Wide Wrestling Federation (WWWF) for a brief run in the late 1970s and was managed by Freddie Blassie. Akbar also worked as a face in the Australian World Championship Wrestling territory for a season in the mid 1970s feuding mainly with The Great Mephisto.

Manager
Akbar retired from active wrestling in 1977 and became a villainous manager in the Texas area territory. He called his stables "Akbars Army" in Mid-South Wrestling for Bill Watts before it became UWF and "Devastation, Inc." in World Class Championship Wrestling for Fritz Von Erich and in 1991 appeared in the World Wrestling Council in Puerto Rico. Akbar smoked cigars at ringside, harassed the fans during his protégés' matches, and occasionally threw fireballs at unsuspecting opponents. In 1994, Akbar briefly managed Kevin Von Erich as a fan favorite in the Global Wrestling Federation. Eventually, though, he turned on Von Erich only weeks before Von Erich decided to retire for good. Akbar also managed Toni Adams for a short time in the GWF.

Retirement
After his semi-retirement, Akbar still made frequent appearances on the independent circuit, while also training wrestlers. He appeared on both the Heroes of World Class and Triumph and Tragedies of World Class retrospective documentaries, released in 2005 and 2007, respectively. From 2008 to 2010, he appeared as a manager in the Dallas-based Wrecking Ball Wrestling promotion. He also operated a countertop business.

Personal life
Often billed from Lebanon, Syria or Saudi Arabia, his father actually was from Lebanon, and his mother, Mary, had Arab roots as well, though she too was born in Texas. With two older sisters, he was the youngest of the family.

Death
Wehba died August 19, 2010 in Texas, reportedly due to complications from a fall or after a long battle with prostate cancer.

Championships and accomplishments
Cauliflower Alley Club
Gulf Coast/CAC Honoree (2006)
Mid-South Sports
NWA Georgia Tag Team Championship (1 time) with Ox Baker
NWA Macon Tag Team Championship (2 times) - with Buddy Colt (1) and Rocket Monroe (1)
Southern Wrestling Hall of Fame
2011 inductee
NWA Tri-State
NWA Tri-State North American Heavyweight Championship (1 time)
NWA United States Tag Team Championship (Tri-State version) (2 times) - with Danny Hodge
Professional Wrestling Hall of Fame and Museum
Class of 2021
World Championship Wrestling (Australia)
NWA Austra-Asian Heavyweight Championship (1 time)
NWA Austra-Asian Tag Team Championship (1 time) - with George Gouliovas
Wrecking Ball Wrestling
Manager of the Year (2009–2010)

Notes

References

External links 
 Championship wrestling from Florida: Skandor Akbar, a collection of flyers between Sept. 21 – Oct. 8, 1971.
 

1934 births
2010 deaths
American people of Lebanese descent
American male professional wrestlers
People from Garland, Texas
People from Wichita Falls, Texas
Professional wrestlers from Texas
Professional Wrestling Hall of Fame and Museum
Professional wrestling managers and valets
Professional wrestling trainers
Professional wrestling promoters
American Eastern Catholics
Sportspeople of Lebanese descent
20th-century professional wrestlers
NWA Austra-Asian Heavyweight Champions
NWA Austra-Asian Tag Team Champions
NWA Macon Tag Team Champions
NWA Georgia Tag Team Champions